iTunes Live from London may refer to:

iTunes Live from London, a 2009 live EP by Little Boots
iTunes Live from London, a 2009 live EP by Miley Cyrus
iTunes Live from London, a 2009 live EP by Snow Patrol

See also
 Live from London (disambiguation)